Delüün is a sum (village) of Bayan-Ölgii Province in western Mongolia. It is primarily inhabited by ethnic Kazakhs. As of 2014 it had a population of 6994 people.

References

Populated places in Mongolia
Districts of Bayan-Ölgii Province